The Maggie Dixon Classic is an annual early season women's college basketball tournament that was first played in 2006. The classic is played in honor of Maggie Dixon who in April 2006, just after leading the Army women's basketball team to their first ever NCAA Tournament, died suddenly due to an arrhythmia caused by a previously undiagnosed heart condition.

On November 12, 2006, the first Maggie Dixon was played at the Christl Arena in West Point, New York; where Maggie coached her only season with the Lady Knights. Since this edition of the Maggie Dixon Classic, every other classic had featured a four team, two game doubleheader. The 2006 Maggie Dixon Classic was the only edition of the event to feature a men's game; in which the Pittsburgh Panthers coached by Jamie Dixon, Maggie's brother; defeated Western Michigan by a final score of 86 to 67.

In 2007, the Maggie Dixon Classic was moved to the historic Madison Square Garden in New York City and has been held there ever since. The Maggie Dixon Classic has also produced the eventual national champions in 2008, 2010, 2011 and 2013. Also in 2010, the UConn women's basketball team tied UCLA's 88 game win streak from the 1970s. The Huskies would eventually break the record and end their winning streak at 90 games.

On January 4, 2015, Immaculata University and Queens College played in the Maggie Dixon Classic as a commemoration of the 40th anniversary of the first game played between women's basketball teams in the Madison Square Garden. The second game of that doubleheader featured the UConn Huskies and St. John's Red Storm.

In 2016, the Classic was moved to the campus of DePaul University in Chicago, the school where Maggie Dixon served as an assistant coach under the direction of Doug Bruno. Upon moving to Chicago, the Classic was also restructured from its traditional format to a four-team knockout tournament. In 2017, Classic Games were moved to the Wintrust Arena; which opened in October of that year.

DePaul has won both Maggie Dixon Classics played in Chicago.

TCU and Texas A&M took part in the event in 2017 at Reed Arena in College Station, Texas. The Classic was then moved to Fort Worth in 2018 and was played Schollmaier Arena, when TCU hosted Dixon's former team, Army. TCU again hosted the Classic the following year in 2019, taking on Boise State.

Past Results and Appearances

Appearances
As of the 2015 Maggie Dixon Classic; excluding the men's game from 2006. Teams in bold text won their game.

Maggie Dixon Courage Award
Since the 2009 Classic, the family of Maggie Dixon has presented the Maggie Dixon Courage Award. This award is presented to an individual who exhibits courage in the face of adversity and continues to exemplify Dixon's mantra of never allowing adversity get in the way of achieving a dream. The award is always presented by Dixon's sister Julie Dixon Silva and by Dixon's older brother Jamie Dixon.

References

Women's basketball competitions in the United States